A special election was held in  January 19-20, 1795 to fill a vacancy left by Representative-election John Barnwell (F) declining to serve the term for which he'd been elected.

Election results

References 

South Carolina 1795 02
South Carolina 1795 02
1795 02
South Carolina 02
United States House of Representatives 02
United States House of Representatives 1795 02